The 1792 United States presidential election in New York took place between November 2 and December 5, 1792 as part of the 1792 United States presidential election. The New York State Legislature chose 12 members of the Electoral College, each of whom, under the provisions of the Constitution prior to the passage of the Twelfth Amendment, cast 2 votes for President.

New York's 12 electors each cast one vote for incumbent George Washington and one vote for George Clinton in the state's first presidential election.
(Although the state had ratified the Constitution to become the eleventh state on July 26, 1788, it did not participate in the first presidential election in 1789 due to the state legislature's being deadlocked.)

See also
 United States presidential elections in New York

References

New York
1792
1792 New York (state) elections